Chryseobacterium hagamense is an bacterial species found in the rhizospheres of coastal sand dune plants. It is Gram-negative, non-spore-forming and non-motile. Its type strain is RHA2-9T (=KCTC 22545T =NBRC 105253T).

References

Further reading
Pridgeon, J. W., P. H. Klesius, and J. C. Garcia. "Identification and virulence of Chryseobacterium indologenes isolated from diseased yellow perch (Perca flavescens)." Journal of Applied Microbiology 114.3 (2013): 636–643.
Kämpfer, Peter, John A. McInroy, and Stefanie P. Glaeser. "Chryseobacterium zeae sp. nov., Chryseobacterium arachidis sp. nov., and Chryseobacterium geocarposphaerae sp. nov. isolated from the rhizosphere environment." Antonie van Leeuwenhoek 105.3 (2014): 491–500.
Park, Sung-Joon, Jung-Hye Choi, and Chang-Jun Cha. "Chryseobacterium rigui sp. nov., isolated from an estuarine wetland." International Journal of Systematic and Evolutionary Microbiology 63.Pt 3 (2013): 1062–1067.

External links

LPSN
Type strain of Chryseobacterium hagamense at BacDive -  the Bacterial Diversity Metadatabase

hagamense